is a private university in Fukaya, Saitama, Japan, established in 1976. The predecessor of the school was founded in 1903.

External links
 

Educational institutions established in 1903
Private universities and colleges in Japan
Universities and colleges in Saitama Prefecture
Engineering universities and colleges in Japan
Fukaya, Saitama
1903 establishments in Japan